The Fourth Angel is a 2001 British-Canadian thriller film directed by John Irvin and starring Jeremy Irons, Forest Whitaker, Jason Priestley and Charlotte Rampling. It was written by Allan Scott, from a homonymous novel by Robin Neillands (writing under the name Robin Hunter). Irons portrays a man who seeks justice after a terrorist attack on the plane in which his family was travelling. The film takes its title from Revelation 16:8: "The fourth angel poured out his bowl upon the sun, and it was given to him to scorch men with fire".

Plot
Jack Elgin (Jeremy Irons) is the European editor of The Economist, a magazine based in London, England. Jack has a wife, Maria (Briony Glassco), and three kids, Joanne (Anna Maguire), Julia (Holly Boyd), and Andrew (Joel Pitts). Jack subtly hijacks the family vacation, changing it from a lazy week of Mediterranean fun and sun in Corfu, Greece, to a tour of India, because of a story he has to cover. Maria is not as impressed as the kids are.

Jack himself envisioned a chance to simultaneously seize a plum reporting assignment and spend at least a smidgen of quality time with his family. But, on the way to India, their plane, a Boeing 747-200 owned by AM Air, an American airline, makes an unscheduled stopover in Limassol, Cyprus, because of a mechanical problem. After a while of waiting inside the Limassol airport, everyone gets back on the plane—which is then hijacked by a group of terrorists known as the August 15th Movement, led by a Serbian man named Ivanic Loyvek (Serge Soric) and his right-hand man Karadan Maldic (Ivan Marevich). And they are demanding $50,000,000 from the U.S. State Department in one hour or everyone on the airplane will die.

The demand is met, and Loyvek and Maldic start releasing the women and children, with the men to go last. But as soon as a front passenger door is opened, a local police team gunning for the terrorists opens fire. The flight attendants frantically open the rest of the airplane's doors and start getting passengers out, but the terrorists start killing passengers, leading to an explosion.

Maria, Joanne, and Julia get out of the airplane, and then Jack, holding Andrew, gets out—only to watch Maria, Joanne, and Julia get shot by the terrorists. Jack tries to hide Andrew's face so he can't see it. Maria and Joanne are dead, and Julia is still alive—but Julia burns to death while crying for help. In all, a total of 15 passengers die, and Loyvek and Maldic, the surviving terrorists, escape, knowing that they now have the $50,000,000. Jack feels that the hijacking would never have ended that way if the police team had waited until after the passengers were released from the airplane before getting trigger happy.

Back in London, an absolutely devastated Jack is told that the terrorists were captured, but they were released and deported secretly, with no charges, no arrest—the result of some awfully compromised politics. Jack is understandably enraged that Loyvek and Maldic got off scot-free. While helping Andrew cope, Jack tries all the legal ways to ensure justice for his family, but to no avail.

Jack pays a visit to Henry Davidson (Jason Priestley), a CIA agent who works at the American Embassy in London. Davidson tells Jack that there's little that can be done. Obviously, the American and British governments are completely impotent when it comes to going after Loyvek and Maldic, so Jack must do it himself.

With the help of his friend ex-intelligence operative Kate Stockton (Charlotte Rampling), who is well-schooled in the finer points of international intelligence, Jack becomes a one-man anti-terrorist squadron, tracking down those who work with Loyvek and Maldic, and turning their own weapons against them. Dogging Jack's trail is FBI agent Jules Bernard (Forest Whitaker), who's cooperating with Scotland Yard on anti-terrorist activities, and who suspects that Jack is the man who has been killing anyone involved in the hijacking.

But as it turns out, Jules is on Jack's side, and he's willing to help Jack. After Jack kills Maldic, it turns out that Davidson was behind everything. Davidson had the airplane hijacked so he could get $50,000,000. With Jules's help, Jack sets out to make Loyvek and Davidson pay for the deaths of his family and the other people who died in Cyprus.

Cast
 Jeremy Irons as Jack Elgin
 Forest Whitaker as FBI Agent Jules Bernard
 Jason Priestley as CIA Agent Henry Davidson
 Briony Glassco as Maria Elgin
 Charlotte Rampling as Kate Stockton
 Lois Maxwell as Olivia
 Timothy West as Jones
 Joel Pitts as Andrew Elgin
 Anna Maguire as Joanne Elgin
 Holly Boyd as Julia Elgin
 Kal Weber as Kulindos
 Ian McNeice as MI5 Agent Lewison
 Serge Soric as Ivanic Loyvek
 Ivan Marevich as Karadan Maldic

Release
Produced in 2001, The Fourth Angel opened in a number of European countries before the events of 9/11. The commercial failure of other terrorist-themed films such as Collateral Damage led to the delay of its wider release, including in the US and UK. It was finally issued direct to DVD in the US in 2003 by Artisan Entertainment.

References

External links
 
 

2001 films
2001 thriller films
British thriller films
British aviation films
Aviation novels
Films directed by John Irvin
Films postponed due to the September 11 attacks
Films about the Serbian Mafia
2000s English-language films
2000s British films